People with Disability Australia Ltd (PWDA) is a national Australian disability rights and advocacy organisation founded in 1980 and based in Surry Hills, New South Wales.

PWDA is a Disabled Persons Organisation (DPO), with an elected board of people with disability, and a national membership of people with disability. PWDA is one of the funded national disability representative organisations for people with disability in Australia.

Former presidents
A list of former presidents of the PWDA:

2002 : Wendy Potter
2003–2006 : Heidi Forrest
2007–2008 : Robert Farley
2009 : Vacant
2010–2011 : Jan Daisley
2012–2015 : Craig Wallace
2016–2017 : Bonnie Millen
2018–2019 : David Abello
2020–current : Samantha Connor

History and mission
PWDA was founded in the year 1980 leading up to the International Year of Disabled Persons to provide people with disabilities a voice of their own. In 2002, PWDA's membership approved a repositioning of PWDA as a national disability rights and advocacy organisation. The organisation's name was changed from "People with Disability New South Wales" to "People with Disability Australia" to reflect this new positioning on 21 July 2003. The principal reasons for the change were to position PWDA to undertake work on national policy issues.

Between 2003 and 2006 PWDA played a valuable role in the development of the United Nations Convention on the Rights of Persons with Disabilities (CRPD), organising national consultations and consultations with members, making submissions, hosting seminars, and supporting delegates to attend sessions of the UN Ad Hoc Committee. Through this work PWDA gained Special Consultative Status with the Economic and Social Council of the United Nations.

From 2009 onwards, PWDA continues to play an ongoing role in monitoring the implementation of the CRPD in Australia, and is part of the NGO CRPD Shadow Report Project Group. Along with the organisation's national work, PWDA has undertaken international development work in the Pacific since 2004. This non-profit, non governmental peak organisation has been described as "the national cross disability rights and advocacy organisation run by and for people with disability... [representing] the interests of people with all kinds of disability.

Craig Wallace, a former president of PWDA, was commended in Parliament on the occasion of his resignation in June 2016. Jenny Macklin MP credited Wallace for the organisation's contribution to the development of a National Disability Insurance Scheme and for elevating "PWDA to the status of a leading disability advocacy body".

PWDA appeared and gave evidence during the 2019-2020 Australian Disability Royal Commission.

Controversy
In 2020, it was reported that the activist group 'Mad F-cking Witches' (MFW) were involved in a 'nasty' internal dispute involving a campaign to remove two PWDA female directors over claims of alleged abusive posts on social media. PWDA had said it was an internal matter even though MFW, an external group, had submitted complaints under consideration.The Age reported that "both women [directors] deny they were abusive, but say they were highly critical of postings from the activist group [MFW] involving disabled people". The attempt to remove them did not succeed. Spiked had previously said MFW manufactures storms of outrage on social media and spends "their time trawling the internet for reasons to be offended". MFW is an online feminist pressure group known for agitating for advertisers to boycott radio broadcaster Alan Jones.

Activities
PWDA provides the following services:
 Rights-related information, advice and referral services for people with disability and their associates
 Short-term individual and group advocacy assistance to people with disability and their associates
 Advocacy for reform around systemic issues that adversely affect people with disability and their associates
 Representation of the sector of interest constituted by people with disability and their associates to government, industry and the non-government sector
 Coordination of the sector of interest constituted by people with disability and their associates
 Disability rights-related research and development around issues of concern to people with disability and their associates
 Disability rights-related training and education for people with disability and their associates, service providers, government and the public. This work is supported in part by grants of financial assistance from both the State and Commonwealth Governments.

See also
 Disability in Australia
 Dignity Party (South Australia)
 National Disability Insurance Scheme
 http://www.disabilityhealthsupport.com.au Disability Health Support Australia

References

External links
 People with Disability Australia Ltd
 UN-Enable Rights and Dignity of Persons with Disabilities

Disability organisations based in Australia
Disability rights organizations
Organizations established in 1980